Reitman (alternate spelling Reitmann) is a family name. It may refer to:

 Ben Reitman (1879–1943), American physician
 Catherine Reitman, actress
 Dorothy Reitman, Canadian community volunteer
 Greg Reitman, film producer 
 Herman Reitman (born 1941), a Romanian-Canadian businessman
 Ivan Reitman (1946–2022), Czechoslovak-born Canadian film and television director, producer and screenwriter
 Jason Reitman, movie director and writer, son of Ivan Reitman
 Jerry Reitman, author, businessman and advertising executive
 Joseph D. Reitman, actor
 Sarah Reitman (born 1950), a Romanian-Canadian businesswoman; wife of Herman
 Francis Reitmann (died 1954), a British psychiatrist

See also
Reitmans Limited (RET), a Canadian retailing company
Reitman v. Mulkey

Jewish surnames
Germanic-language surnames
Yiddish-language surnames